Low Stars is the debut album from Los Angeles band Low Stars. Signed by Hear Music, and released through Starbucks, the album features single "Calling All Friends", which was the theme song for ABC television series What About Brian. "Need a Friend" and "LA Forever" were featured in TV and film respectively. "Just Around the Corner" was the featured video from the album.

The cover photograph by Henry Diltz was taken in Agora Hills at the same location where he shot the cover of the Eagles' Desperado.

Track listing
"Tell the Teacher" (Jude/Chris Seefried) – 5:05
"Child" (Chris Seefried) – 4:18
"Calling All Friends" (Jude/Chris Seefried) – 4:18
"Tracks in the Rain" (Chris Seefried) – 4:13
"Need a Friend" (Jude/Chris Seefried/Jeff Russo/Dave Gibbs) – 4:09
"Can't Live Without Your Love" (Jeff Russo) – 3:41
"Just Around the Corner" (Chris Seefried/Jude/Jeff Russo/Dave Gibbs) – 3:55
"Why Not Your Baby" (Gene Clark) – 3:58
"Love" (Jude) – 2:30
"Sometimes It Rains" (Chris Seefried/Jude) – 4:32
"Mexico" (Jude) – 3:45
"Warmer Wind" (Jude/Chris Seefried) – 4:36
"LA Forever" (Chris Seefried/Marshall Altman) – 4:30

Personnel
Chris Seefried: vocals, acoustic guitar, electric guitar, bass, production
Dave Gibbs: vocals, acoustic guitar
Jeff Russo: vocals, acoustic guitar, electric guitar, drums, engineering
Jude: vocals, acoustic guitar

Additional personnel
George Drakoulias: producer
David Immergluck: mandolin, acoustic guitar, pedal steel, dobro
Brendan O'Brien: bass
Charlie Gillingham: accordion
Chris Joyner: piano, Hammond B3
Zac Rae: Hammond B3, pump organ
Don Heffington: drums
Fred Eltringham: drums
Blair Sinta: drum
Sheldon Gomberg: double bass, engineering, production
Dusty Wakeman: bass
David Wilder: bass
Gary DeRosa: tambourine
Ludvig Girdland: violin
Anna Stafford: violin
Phillip Vaiman: violin
Richard Rintoul: viola
Matt Cooker: cello
Ben Decter: string arranger
Fred Kevorkian: mastering
Jean Marie Horvat: mixing
Dave Bianco: engineering
Ryan Williams: engineering, mixing
Robert Hawes: engineering
Richard Barron: engineering
Eric Corne: assistant engineering
David Vaught: assistant engineering
Henry Diltz: photography
Craig Ruda: photography

Promotional videos
"Low Stars epk" (2007), directed by Ehud Lazin
"Calling All Friends" (2007)
"Child" (2007)
"Just Around the Corner" (2008), directed by Calire Taylour Sullivan
"Low Stars and Friends" (2009), directed by Ehud Lazin

References

2007 debut albums
Albums produced by George Drakoulias
Albums produced by Chris Seefried